Deh Rud (also Romanized as Deh Rūd) is a village in Amjaz Rural District, in the Central District of Anbarabad County, Kerman Province, Iran. At the 2006 census, its population was 618, in 105 families.

References 

Populated places in Anbarabad County